is a Brazilian group of comedians who ran a TV show named , broadcast by Rede Globo between 1993 and 2010. The humour featured on the show is mostly sketches, relating to broad Brazilian pop culture subjects (soap opera, political satire, regional stereotypes, and others).

The group founded a company called  ("Toviassu Artistic Productions"), whose name is an acronym composed of syllables from the phrase "" – "Every gay is deaf"; which is the ending of a widely known Brazilian practical joke. Each one of the seven members has a specific function within the company.

A few years later, they starred in their own show.

Members

 Beto Silva
 Bussunda (died June 17, 2006 as a victim of a heart attack, while covering the World Cup in Germany)
 Cláudio Manuel
 Hélio de La Peña
 Hubert
 Marcelo Madureira
 Reinaldo Figueiredo
 Maria Paula (sometimes considered the 8th member, at least for the TV show)
 Mú Chebabi (the group's music producer and main composer)

TV Pirata

In April 1988, Rede Globo premiered a new weekly comedy series on their Tuesday prime time slot called "TV Pirata" (Pirate TV). The show was written by Casseta Popular and Planeta Diáro writers and consisted of a new approach in Brazilian comedy with sketches spoofing pop culture, Brazilian society and social life, "novelas" (soap operas), politics, celebrities and others with a fresh no-nonsense style of comedy (borrowing from Saturday Night Live and Monty Python's Flying Circus); This style of sketch comedy was considered fresh and groundbreaking for Brazilian audiences who weren't accustomed to such an approach. The show gained audience slowly, until it became a cultural phenomenon. The program also featured dramatic actors like Debora Bloch, Marco Nanini, Cláudia Raia and Ney Latorraca in comedic roles instead of the dramatic roles they usually performed. Some of the performers, however, went on to play more comedy roles later in their careers. The show ended in 1990, due to various cast changes as well as declines in ratings; It was revived briefly in early 1992, being cancelled for good just a few months later. The TV show, however, became a cult and a landmark in Brazilian comedy as there has never been a show like it before or since.

References

External links
  Official site
  Casseta com Bola e Tudo, Globo Esporte

Rede Globo original programming
Television sketch shows
Brazilian comedy television series
Portuguese-language television shows
1993 Brazilian television series debuts
2010 Brazilian television series endings
1990s Brazilian television series
2000s Brazilian television series
2010s Brazilian television series
Comedy collectives
Brazilian parodists